La Revancha Del Príncipe Charro is the second studio album by Mexican rock band Panda, released on 11 February 2002 through Movic Records.

The band found moderate mainstream success, and was later certified platinum in Mexico with reportedly over 100,000 sales. Continuing with the lovelace, immature and humorous pop punk sound and lyrical content explored in their debut album, they implemented keyboard and synthesizer effects to their predominant skate punk tone.

Track listing

Personnel 
Adapted from La Revancha Del Príncipe Charro's liner notes.

Panda
 José Madero – vocals, guitar, moog
Jorge "Ongi" Garza – lead guitar, secondary vocals
 Ricardo Treviño – bass
 Jorge "Kross" Vázquez – drums

Production
Adrián "Rojo" Treviño – producer, mixer
Francisco “Kiko” Lobo de la Garza – executive producer
Heriberto López – recording assistant
Gerardo García – studio tech
Blas Escamilla – studio runner
Nancy Matter – mastering engineer at Moonlight Mastering, in Los Angeles, California
Mario Videgaray – art direction, design
Karime García Travesí – photography
Sergio Moreno – illustration
Session musicians
Marcelo Treviño – keyboards (track 8), strings arrangement (track 15)
Fer Salinas – piano (track 5)
Marcelo Madero – spoken voice (track 9)
Alfonso Herrera – choirs

Certifications

References

 http://artists.letssingit.com/panda-album-la-revancha-del-principe-charro-cwzm45 - Letssingit.com
 https://www.amazon.com/Revancha-Del-Principe-Charro-Panda/dp/B000084TV7 - Amazon.com

Panda (band) albums

2002 albums